Steven Howard Hahn (born 1951) is Professor of History at New York University.

Life
Hahn was born on July 18, 1951, in New York City. Educated at the University of Rochester, where he worked with Eugene Genovese and Herbert Gutman, Hahn received his Doctor of Philosophy degree from Yale University. His dissertation was overseen by C. Vann Woodward, and later Howard R. Lamar.

He has written on the South, slavery and emancipation, the Populist Era, rural cultures, and social migration.  His first book was The Roots of Southern Populism:  Yeoman Farmers and the Transformation of the Georgia Upcountry, 1850–1890 (Oxford University Press, 1983).  This study was important because it provided a detailed and original account of the political ideology of white southern small farmers.  At the time this group, the majority of the American South, had received relatively little scholarly attention.  Hahn presented the southern yeomen as non-capitalist in crucial respects, and describes how they were undermined by the increasing commercialization of Southern agriculture after the Civil War.  Populists were presented as having had almost no interest in a genuinely biracial polity.

In 2003 Hahn published his second book A Nation Under Our Feet: Black Political Struggles in the Rural South from Slavery to the Great Migration, which won the 2004 Pulitzer Prize for History.  Several historians have noted that in this book a union of black and white workers is presented as a much more likely possibility.  In 2009 he published The Political Worlds of Slavery and Freedom, a version of the Nathan I. Huggins Lecture he delivered at Harvard University two years earlier.  His latest book, A Nation Without Borders:  The United States and Its World in an Age of Civil Wars was published in 2016 by Penguin Press.

Hahn has won a number of teaching awards and has been supported in his research by the Guggenheim Foundation, the American Council of Learned Societies, the Center for Advanced Study in the Behavioral Sciences at Stanford, and the Huntington Library in San Marino, California.

Hahn has taught at the University of Delaware, the University of California, San Diego, Northwestern University, the University of Pennsylvania, and New York University.  He has two children, Declan Hahn and Saoirse, and lives in New York City.

Awards
 1980 Allan Nevins Prize of the Society of American Historians, for his doctoral dissertation, The Roots of Southern Populism
 1984 Frederick Jackson Turner Award of the Organization of American Historians, for The Roots of Southern Populism:  Yeoman Farmers and the Transformation of the Georgia Upcountry, 1850–1890
 2004 Pulitzer Prize for History, for A Nation Under Our Feet
 2004 Bancroft Prize, for A Nation Under Our Feet
 Merle Curti Award in Social History from the Organization of American Historians

Bibliography

References

External links
Faculty page at NYU
"Steven Hahn", Penn Current, Sandy Smith, April 29, 2004

21st-century American historians
American male non-fiction writers
Historians of the United States
Populism scholars
Pulitzer Prize for History winners
New York University faculty
University of Rochester alumni
Yale University alumni
Living people
1951 births
Bancroft Prize winners
21st-century American male writers